Marvell Scott (born February 28, 1973) is a physician and former journalist.

He is a graduate of Wheaton Central High School in Wheaton, Illinois, a graduate of the University of Delaware and a graduate of Wright State University Boonshoft School of Medicine.

Scott was recruited from high school, and played as a football running back at the University of Illinois, in the Big Ten conference.  He played two seasons as a professional indoor football player in addition to playing semi-pro baseball as a pitcher. He also won a state championship in bodybuilding as a teen.

In 2002, Scott joined WABC-TV as its weekend sports reporter.

Scott is a New York state-licensed, nationally board-certified medical doctor, with an emphasis on preventive care and sports medicine. He is also a nationally-accredited exercise and performance expert who designs specialized fitness and wellness programs.

Legal controversy 
On February 23, 2010 the New York Post reported that Scott was to be arraigned on second-degree rape charges.  The New York Daily News reported that the victim was a 14-year-old child runaway, coerced into prostitution by an adult male. On August 14, 2011, Scott pleaded guilty to misdemeanor injuring the welfare of a child in the case in a plea agreement in which he would get 20 days of community service and ultimately have his record cleared.

In June 2015, Scott was reported to be a victim in an extortion plot hatched by an exotic dancer he had developed a romantic relationship with after meeting her at a strip club.  The dancer reportedly recorded video of Scott snorting a "white powdery substance" and, along with two friends, threatened Scott with releasing the video to the news media and the medical disciplinary board if Scott didn't pay the extortionists $100,000.  The extortionists were eventually all identified and charged in the scheme.

References

External links
 - football recruiting site
 - Wright State Medical School Class of 2001
  -  NY Daily News Ex-WABC sportscaster Marvell Scott charged with raping 14-year-old
 - Former TV sportscaster-turned-doctor believed to be victim of alleged Poconos' extortion case
 - Three Charged in Extortion Case Against Prominent Doctor, Former Sportscaster

American television journalists
New York (state) television reporters
Television anchors from New York City
1973 births
Living people
American male journalists
Wright State University alumni
People from Wheaton, Illinois
University of Delaware alumni
Journalists from Illinois